Asemonea virgea is a jumping spider species in the genus Asemonea  that lives in the Republic of the Congo. The male was first described in 2003.

References

Endemic fauna of the Republic of the Congo
Salticidae
Fauna of the Republic of the Congo
Spiders of Africa
Spiders described in 2003
Taxa named by Wanda Wesołowska